XSI may refer to:

 Softimage XSI, a high-end three-dimensional (3D) graphics application
 South Indian Lake Airport, the IATA code for the airport in Canada
 Canon EOS 450D, known as EOS Rebel XSi in North America, a DSLR camera from Canon
 X/Open System Interfaces Extension, a supplementary specification to the Single UNIX Specification 
 A conventional XML namespace prefix for XML Schema instance information
 Broadsoft Xtended Services Interface, a set of APIs for integrating BroadWorks functions with Internet services